Elias Wessén (15 April 1889 – 30 January 1981) was a prominent Swedish linguist and a professor of Scandinavian languages at Stockholm University (1928–1956). In 1947, he was honoured with one of the 18 seats at the Swedish Academy (which for instance awards the Nobel Prize in Literature).

His earliest work concerned morphological problems in the Germanic languages, Onomasiology and Norse mythology. He published parts of Sveriges runinskrifter, editions of medieval texts and together with Åke Holmbäck, a translation of the Swedish medieval province laws (with commentaries). He published several reference works, such as Svensk språkhistoria in three tomes, and a grammar for modern Swedish Vårt svenska språk. In 1944, he initiated Nämnden för svensk språkvård (nowadays Språkrådet, the Swedish Language Council).

References

Further reading
 Wessén, Elias G A in Vem är det 1977, pp. 1079–1080

1889 births
1981 deaths
20th-century linguists
Linguists from Sweden
Germanic studies scholars
Members of the Swedish Academy
Academic staff of Stockholm University
Old Norse studies scholars
Runologists
Members of the Royal Gustavus Adolphus Academy